Little Sparks is the third album by Delorentos released in 2012.

Further details
This album won "Irish Album Of The Year" at the 2013 Meteor awards.

Track listing

Chart performance

References

External links

 Chart details

Delorentos albums
2012 albums